Iryna Ustymenko (born 3 April 1957) is a Ukrainian former butterfly and freestyle swimmer. She competed in three events at the 1972 Summer Olympics for the Soviet Union.

References

External links
 

1957 births
Living people
Ukrainian female butterfly swimmers
Ukrainian female freestyle swimmers
Olympic swimmers of the Soviet Union
Swimmers at the 1972 Summer Olympics
Sportspeople from Donetsk
Soviet female butterfly swimmers
Soviet female freestyle swimmers